The  Military Ordinariate of Brazil  is a Latin Church military ordinariate of the Catholic Church. Immediately exempt to the Holy See, it provides pastoral care to Catholics serving in the Brazilian Armed Forces and their families.

History
It was created as a military vicariate on 6 November 1950, with the first military vicar appointment on the same day. It was elevated to a military ordinariate on 21 July 1986. The military ordinary's seat is located at the Military Cathedral of Saint Mary of the Military Queen of Peace (Catedral Militar Santa Maria dos Militares Rainha da Paz) in the city of Brasília.

Bishops

Ordinaries
Military vicars
 Jaime de Barros Câmara (appointed 6 November 1950 – resigned 9 November 1963)
 Jose Newton de Almeida Baptista (appointed 9 November 1963 – became military ordinary 21 July 1986)

Military ordinaries
 Jose Newton de Almeida Baptista (appointed 21 July 1986 – retired 31 October 1990)
 Geraldo do Espírito Santo Ávila (appointed 31 October 1990 – died 14 November 2005)
 Osvino José Both (appointed 7 June 2006 - retired 6 August 2014)
 Fernando José Monteiro Guimarães, C.SS.R. (appointed 6 August 2014- retired 12 March 2022)
 Marcony Vinícius Ferreira (appointed 12 March 2022- incumbent)

Auxiliary bishops
Alberto Trevisan, S.A.C. (1964-1966), appointed Auxiliary Bishop of São Sebastião do Rio de Janeiro
Augustinho Petry (2000-2007), appointed Coadjutor Bishop of Rio do Sul, Santa Catarina
José Francisco Falcão de Barros (2011-)

References

 Military Ordinariate of Brazil (Catholic-Hierarchy)
 Ordinariado Militar do Brasil (GCatholic.org)

Brazil
Brazil
1950 establishments in Brazil